William MacDonald Rutherford (19 January 1945 – 24 October 2010) was an Australian soccer player.

Playing career

Club career
Rutherford played youth football for Methil before signing with East Fife where he made 27 league appearances, scoring 11 goals. In the late 1960s he moved to Forfar Athletic where he made only five appearances before emigrating to Australia.

Arriving in Australia in 1968, Rutherford joined Sydney Hakoah, where he played in several stints until the mid-1970s. He also played in Hong Kong during the Australian off-season.

While playing for Hakoah, he represented the state of New South Wales three times. During his time with the club he was noted as a mercurial, unpredictable but undeniably brilliant player, rated by some as Sydney’s most valuable forward....

Rutherford was a very fast runner who took up professional running with some success in the 1970s.

International career
Rutherford played six times for the Australia national team. All of his matches were played in 1969 during Australia's failed qualification for the 1970 FIFA World Cup.

Outside Football
A building industry supervisor, Rutherford married once and later divorced. He and his former wife had one son.

References

External links

 Vale Willie Rutherford - Football Federation Australia obituary - published 27 October 2010

1945 births
2010 deaths
Australian soccer players
Australia international soccer players
East Fife F.C. players
Forfar Athletic F.C. players
Scottish Football League players
People from Lochgelly
Scottish emigrants to Australia
Sportspeople from Fife
Association football forwards